Qaraqoyunlu (also, Karakoyumlu, Karakoyunlu, and Kara-Koyunly) is a village in the Qubadli Rayon of Azerbaijan.

Qara Qoyunlu is Azeri village Qubadli

References 

Populated places in Qubadli District